Geppert is a surname and may refer to:

 Julius Geppert (1856–1937), German pharmacologist
 Denis Geppert (born 1976), German luger
 Edyta Geppert (born 1953), Polish singer
 Eugeniusz Geppert (1890–1979), Polish painter
  (1902–1945), German mathematician and Nazi supporter, brother of Maria-Pia
 Maria-Pia Geppert (1907–1997), German mathematician and biostatistician, sister of Harald